Čierne is a village and municipality in Čadca District in the Žilina Region of northern Slovakia, on the border with Poland and the Czech Republic.

History
In historical records the village was first mentioned in 1662.

In November 1938, the village was annexed by the Polish Army, in wake of the annexation of Zaolzie region to the Second Polish Republic.

Geography
The municipality lies at an altitude of 454 metres and covers an area of 20.841 km². It has a population of about 4,405 people.

Genealogical resources

The records for genealogical research are available at the state archive "Statny Archiv in Bytca, Slovakia"

 Roman Catholic church records (births/marriages/deaths): 1742-1918 (parish A)

See also
 List of municipalities and towns in Slovakia

External links
 http://www.statistics.sk/mosmis/eng/run.html
Surnames of living people in Cierne

Villages and municipalities in Čadca District